Fekre azad is an Iranian newspaper in the Fars region. The Concessionaire of this newspaper was Habibollah Noubakht and it was published in Shiraz since 1919.

See also
List of magazines and newspapers of Fars

References

Newspapers published in Fars Province
Mass media in Fars Province
Newspapers published in Qajar Iran